Committee for the Promotion of Virtue and the Prevention of Vice may refer to:
 Committee for the Propagation of Virtue and the Prevention of Vice (Gaza Strip)
 Committee for the Promotion of Virtue and the Prevention of Vice (Saudi Arabia)
 Ministry for the Propagation of Virtue and the Prevention of Vice (Afghanistan)

See also
Ministry for the Propagation of Virtue and the Prevention of Vice (disambiguation)
Enjoining good and forbidding wrong
Islamic religious police